Liujia may refer to:
Lioujia District, a district in Tainan, Taiwan
Liujia line, a railway line in Hsinchu County, Taiwan
Liujia railway station, a railway station in Zhubei, Hsinchu County, Taiwan
Liujia village (劉家村), a village in Zhangdian District of Zibo city in Shandong province, China